Glacial erratic boulders of Kitsap County are large glacial erratic boulders of rock which were moved into Kitsap County, Washington by glacial action during previous ice ages.

Kitsap County was so extensively formed by glaciation that according to J Harlen Bretz almost any east-west traverse across the Kitsap Peninsula (shared with two other counties) will describe an ascending and descending profile across till ridges.

List of boulders

References

External links
Washington glacial erratics project at University of Washington dept. of earth and space sciences

Landforms of Kitsap County, Washington
 Kitsap County